Untitled (Selections From 12) is a 1997 promotional-only EP by the German band The Notwist which was released exclusively in the United States. Though the release of the EP was primarily to promote the band's then-current album, 12, it contains one track from their 1992 second album, Nook, as well as the non-album cover version of Robert Palmer's "Johnny and Mary". The version of "Torture Day" on this EP features the vocals of Cindy Dall.

Track listing
"The String" – 3:43
"The Incredible Change of Our Alien" – 4:59
"Johnny and Mary" – 4:52
"Torture Day (Loup)" – 6:12
"Noah" – 5:44

1997 EPs
Zero Hour Records albums
The Notwist albums